Duraid Lahham (in Roman transliteration, sometimes spelled "Durayd Lahham") is a leading Syrian comedian and director born 1934 in Damascus, Syria. He is famous for acting the role of "Ghawwar El Toshe" in a number of movies and series. His co-star throughout his career was Nihad Qali who played the role of "Husni Al Borazani".

Life
Lahham was born in the Shi'ite Hay al-Amin neighborhood of Damascus in 1934 to a Syrian father and a Lebanese mother from Machghara. He grew up in poverty and had to work at several odd jobs to earn a living. He later would recall these difficult days, saying that he used to buy used clothes, reserved for the poor in Syria, and barely made enough money to feed himself. He enrolled at the University of Damascus and studied chemistry. During his college years, he was active in a form of folklore Levantine dance called "dabke" and became obsessed with acting. When he completed his education, Lahham became an instructor at the Chemistry Department at the University. Meanwhile, Lahham gave dancing classes and enhanced his relationship with the artistic community in Syria. When Syrian Television was launched in 1960, Lahham was hired along with his friend Nihad Qali to act a series of short episodes called Damascus Evening (Sahret Demashq).  
 
During the 1970s, Lahham acted in several political plays which gained large popularity throughout the Arab World for their critique of prevailing social and political conditions in various Arab countries.

Work 
From 1960 to 1976, Lahham and Qali formed a pair, called "Duraid and Nihad," that became highly successful and famous among various Arab audiences. However, by 1976, Nihad had to retire as he suffered from an illness. From that on, Lahham started to write, act and direct his work .

Lahham's work was greatly influenced by the political events in the Arab World and this was reflected in the different plays he wrote and directed. His films also carry political overtones and have been described as "deal[ing] with the artificiality and impracticality of borders between Arab states and with the abuse of human rights in the Arab world."

UNICEF Goodwill Ambassador
Lahham was appointed UNICEF Goodwill Ambassador to the Middle East and North Africa region in 1999.
In 2004, he visited districts of Southern Lebanon which had been liberated from Israeli occupation, and gave a speech at a press conference criticizing George W. Bush and Ariel Sharon, comparing them to Hitler. This caused Tel Aviv to protest Lahham's "undiplomatic language" to the UNICEF, which resulted in the UNICEF relieving him of his duties.

Recognition
Lahham received several medals in recognition of his contributions:
 In 1976, Hafez al-Assad, Syrian President at the time, awarded Lahham with the Order of Civil Merit, Excellence Class.
 In 1979, Tunisian President Habib Bourguiba awarded him with a medal in recognition of his work
 In 1991, Libyan President Muammar al-Gaddafi awarded him a medal
 In 2000, Lahham received The Order of Merit of the Lebanese Republic, awarded to him by Lebanese President Émile Lahoud

Filmography

Cinema
Khayat Al-Sayyidate
Allaz Al-Zareef
Al-Hudood (1984)
Al-Taqreer
Ghriam Fee Istanbul
Fendooq Al-Ahlam
Imber Atwareaya Ghawwar
Al-melyouneara
'aqed Al-lu' lu'
Sah Al-Noum
Kafroun
Al-Muziafoun
Mesek wa 'ember (Meratee Melyouneara)
Samak Bala Hasak
Al-Sa'aleek
Imra'ah Taskoun Wahdaha
Laqa' Fee Tahmer
Al-Wardah Al-Hamra'
Al-Tha'lab
La'eb Al-Kura
Zogatee Min Al-Habiz
Al-Nasabeen Al-Thalatha
'indama Ta'gheeb Al-Zowagat
Ana' 'antar
Wahid + Wahid
Al-Sadeeqan
Al-Shereadan
Ghawwar Jemis bounid
Muqalib Fee Al-Mekseek
Ramal Min Dheheb
Al-Rajel Al-Munasib
Al-Aba'a Al-Sighar
Celina (musical)
Damascus Aleppo (2019)

Television

 Ahlam Abu Al hana
 Aaelati wa ana
 Al Kherbeh
 Hammam El-Hana
 Sah Elnoum
 Melh ou Sukar
 Wayn El Ghalat
 Al Doughri
 Aoudat Ghawar
 Maa'leb Ghawwar

References

External links
Duraid Lahham's Official Web Site
Duraid Lahham's series of articles in Forward Magazine

1934 births
Living people
Syrian people of Lebanese descent
Syrian film directors
Syrian male film actors
People from Damascus
United Nations High Commissioner for Refugees Goodwill Ambassadors
Syrian male television actors
Recipients of the Order of Merit (Lebanon)
Syrian Shia Muslims
Muslim male comedians